The enzyme 5-oxopent-3-ene-1,2,5-tricarboxylate decarboxylase catalyzes the chemical reaction

5-oxopent-3-ene-1,2,5-tricarboxylate  2-oxohept-3-enedioate + CO2

This enzyme belongs to the family of lyases, specifically the carboxy-lyases, which cleave carbon-carbon bonds.  The systematic name of this enzyme class is 5-oxopent-3-ene-1,2,5-tricarboxylate carboxy-lyase (2-oxohept-3-enedioate-forming). Other names in common use include 5-carboxymethyl-2-oxo-hex-3-ene-1,6-dioate decarboxylase, and 5-oxopent-3-ene-1,2,5-tricarboxylate carboxy-lyase.  This enzyme participates in tyrosine metabolism.

Structural studies

As of late 2007, only one structure has been solved for this class of enzymes, with the PDB accession code .

References 

 

EC 4.1.1
Enzymes of known structure